Mack Lee Hill (August 17, 1940 – December 14, 1965) was an American football player, a running back at Southern University and for the American Football League's Kansas City Chiefs. He died suddenly after undergoing knee surgery, two days after a game against the Buffalo Bills.

Career
Born and raised in Quincy, Florida, Hill made the Chiefs' roster in 1964 as a rookie free agent out of Southern University in Baton Rouge, signing for only $300, with an agreement he would only be paid if he made the lineup. He wound up as the team's second-leading rusher that season with 567 yards and four touchdowns on 105 carries.  Hill played in the AFL All-Star Game after his rookie campaign. He gained 627 yards, second-most on the team, in 1965, even though he did not complete the season, dying in knee surgery after the 12th game. He was nicknamed "The Truck."

Death
Hill tore a ligament in his right knee in a regular season game against the Bills on December 12, forcing him to undergo season-ending surgery on that knee two days later at Menorah Medical Center in Kansas City. Doctors said he suffered a "sudden and massive embolism."

Team doctor  Albert R. Miller said the embolism could have been caused by a fat globule breaking off and entering the bloodstream, or it could have been triggered by a severe reaction to the anesthesia.

Head coach Hank Stram said, "Mack Lee Hill was a fine gentleman and a great football player. He was probably one of the most unselfish players I have ever coached. He was completely dedicated to the team. Football was his life."

Through Hill's inspiration, the Chiefs created the Mack Lee Hill Award, which is given each season to the team's most outstanding rookie.  His No. 36 jersey has been retired.

Hill had one son.

See also
List of American Football League players
List of American football players who died during their career

References

External links

1940 births
1965 deaths
American football fullbacks
African-American players of American football
Southern Jaguars football players
Players of American football from Florida
People from Quincy, Florida
Kansas City Chiefs players
American Football League All-Star players
Deaths from embolism
American Football League players
20th-century African-American sportspeople
National Football League players with retired numbers